Chernizh is a rural locality (a selo) in Seletskoye Rural Settlement, Suzdalsky District, Vladimir Oblast, Russia. The population was 145 as of 2010. There are 3 streets.

Geography 
Chernizh is located 7 km south of Suzdal (the district's administrative centre) by road. Gnezdilovo is the nearest rural locality.

References 

Rural localities in Suzdalsky District